Mooseknuckle may refer to:

 Crotchbulge, slang for the outline of a man's genitalia through clothing
 a town in the animated series Iggy Arbuckle
 a competitor clothing brand to Canada Goose (clothing)
 a 2012 single by musician Zachariah Selwyn
 Elk, the keratinized hoove of a moose